Sierra de Alcaraz y Campo de Montiel is a comarca of the Province of Albacete, Spain. 

Comarcas of the Province of Albacete